Alexandru Tăutu was a Romanian bobsledder who competed in the 1930s. At the 1936 Winter Olympics in Garmisch-Partenkirchen, he was listed in the four-man event, but did not compete.

References
1936 bobsleigh four-man results
1936 Olympic Winter Games official report. - p. 416.

External links
 

Bobsledders at the 1936 Winter Olympics
Olympic bobsledders of Romania
Possibly living people
Romanian male bobsledders
Year of birth missing